Haze Dunster (born 1 March 1999) is a professional rugby league footballer who plays as a er for the Parramatta Eels in the National Rugby League.

Playing career
Dunster graduated from Parramatta's Jersey Flegg team in the Intrust Super Premiership with the Wentworthville Magpies. In 2019, Dunster re-signed with Parramatta until the end of the 2020 season. Dunster appeared in the 2019 Intrust Super Premiership grand final loss, against Newtown.

2020
Dunster began the year in the Eels 30 man squad, appearing as 18th man twice. Dunster made his NRL debut in week two of the finals of the 2020 NRL season for Parramatta against South Sydney, in a 38–24 loss at Bankwest Stadium, after being called into the team to play on gameday after Michael Jennings tested positive to drugs.

2021
In round 13 of the 2021 NRL season, Dunster scored his first try in the top grade as Parramatta defeated Newcastle 40–4.
Dunster finished the 2021 NRL season with 13 appearances scoring three tries.  He played in both finals matches against Newcastle and Penrith as the club bowed out of the finals at the second week for the third consecutive season.  In September, he was named Parramatta's Rookie of the year.
In December, Dunster signed a new deal with Parramatta to remain at the club until the end of the 2025 season.

2022
On 20 February, Dunster's 2022 NRL season was ended in Parramatta’s first trial match of the year against St. George Illawarra. Dunster was on the receiving end of a hip-drop tackle from opponent Tyrell Fuimaono which tore his ACL, PCL and MCL, thus ruling him out for the entire year.

References

External links
Eels profile

1999 births
Living people
New Zealand Māori rugby league players
New Zealand rugby league players
Parramatta Eels players
Rugby league players from Rotorua
Rugby league wingers
Wentworthville Magpies players